Frank Carroll is an American politician and a Republican member of the Arizona Senate representing District 28 since January 9, 2023. He previously served in the Arizona House of Representatives representing District 22 from 2019 to 2023. Carroll was first elected in 2018 to succeed State Representative David Livingston, who instead ran for State Senate.
Carroll was born in Chicago and later moved to Arizona, becoming involved with the Arizona Republican Party including serving as a Precinct Committeeman. His campaign biography describes him as a Christian conservative.

References

Year of birth missing (living people)
Living people
Republican Party members of the Arizona House of Representatives
21st-century American politicians